Elemér Terták (born 2 November 1918 in Budapest, Hungary; died 8 July 1999 in Budapest) was a Hungarian figure skater who competed in men's singles.  He won the bronze medal at the 1934 European Figure Skating Championships, the 1937 European Championships, and the 1937 World Figure Skating Championships.  He also competed in the 1936 Winter Olympic Games, finishing eighth. He was also a figure skating judge and referee.

Results

References

1918 births
1999 deaths
Hungarian male single skaters
Olympic figure skaters of Hungary
Figure skaters at the 1936 Winter Olympics
World Figure Skating Championships medalists
European Figure Skating Championships medalists
Figure skaters from Budapest